is a town located in Kume District, Okayama Prefecture, Japan., the town had an estimated population of 13,060 in 5867 households and a population density of 56 persons per km².

Geography
Misaki is located on the Kibi Plateau, in the east-central part of Okayama Prefecture. Most of the town is occupied by mountains and forests. The Asahi River runs through the center of the town, and Yoshii River runs through the eastern part. The urban center of the town is the area around JR Kamenokō Station, where the town hall, shops, and public facilities are located.

Neighboring  municipalities 
Okayama Prefecture
Okayama
Tsuyama
Akaiwa
Mimasaka
Maniwa
Kumenan
Shōō
 Kibichūō
 Wake

Climate
Misaki has a Humid subtropical climate (Köppen Cfa) characterized by warm summers and cool winters with moderate snowfall.  The average annual temperature in Misaki is 13.9 °C. The average annual rainfall is 1501 mm with September as the wettest month. The temperatures are highest on average in January, at around 25.9 °C, and lowest in January, at around 2.2 °C.

Demography
Per Japanese census data, the population of Misaki has been as follows.

History 
The area of Misaki was part of ancient Mimasaka Province.  The city of Misaki was founded on March 22, 2005 by the merger of the towns of Asahi, Chūō and Yanahara, all from Kume District.

Government
Misaki has a mayor-council form of government with a directly elected mayor and a unicameral town council of ten members. Misaki, collectively with the town of Kumenan, contributes one member to the Okayama Prefectural Assembly. In terms of national politics, the town is part of the Okayama 3rd district of the lower house of the Diet of Japan.

Economy
The main industry in the area is agriculture. The main crops are rice, fruit trees such as pears and grapes, leaf tobacco,, and poultry farming.

Education
Misaki has five public elementary school and three public junior high school operated by the town government. The town does not have a high school.

Transportation

Railway 
 JR West (JR West) - Tsuyama Line
  -

Highways

Local attractions
Sightseeing spots include JR Kamenokō Station, which has a turtle-shaped station building, Sankyu Park, which is famous for its cherry blossoms and azaleas, Makiba no Yakata, a nature experience park, and an exhibition operation that utilizes an abandoned railroad line.

References

External links

Misaki official website 

Towns in Okayama Prefecture